Khabarovsk Airlines Flight 463 was a scheduled domestic passenger flight from Nikolayevsk-on-Amur Airport to Nelkan Airport in Russia. On 15 November 2017 the Let L-410 Turbolet operating the flight crashed short of the runway at Nelkan Airport, killing all but one of the seven people on board. The sole survivor was a three-year-old girl who sustained serious injuries. The crash was caused by a malfunction of the right engine's propeller.

Accident 
During approach to runway 04 at Nelkan airport, the aircraft suddenly lost speed, rolled 180 degrees to the left, and crashed into a forest  from the runway. Both pilots (who were also the only crew members on board) and four of the five passengers on board were killed. There were no fatalities on the ground.

Aircraft 

The aircraft involved was an Let 410UVP-E20, registration RA-67047, msn 3010. It first few in 2015 and was powered by two General Electric H80-200 engines. At the time of the accident, the aircraft had flown for 1,693 hours and completed 1,071 flights.

Passengers and crew 
There were five passengers and two crew members, totaling up to seven people.

The captain was 42-year-old Igor Leonidovich Shumakov, who had 12,076 flight hours, including 1,243 hours on the Let L-410 Turbolet. The first officer was 30-year old Alexander Alexandrovich Zuev, who had 1,220 flight hours with 837 of them on the Let L-410 Turbolet. One survivor, a child age 3 years, was severely injured.

Investigation 
The Interstate Aviation Committee investigated the accident with assistance from the Czech Air Accidents Investigation Institute, representing the state of manufacture of the aircraft. A preliminary report was released on 22 December 2017. The final report was released in August 2019. The cause of the accident was that the propeller on the right hand engine had gone into negative pitch in flight, leading to a loss of control. Twenty-four safety recommendations were made.

Safety actions
At the time of the accident, there were no instructions given to pilots for use in the event of a propeller going into beta range in flight. The risk of this happening being assessed as 1 in 10−14. Following the accident, and evidence being found of other occurrences, an instruction was issued that the affected propeller was to be feathered and the flight completed on one engine.

See also 
 List of accidents and incidents involving the Let L-410 Turbolet
 List of sole survivors of airline accidents or incidents

References

External links 
Interstate Aviation Committee
 Investigation profile
 Final report
 Investigation profile  – the Russian version is the report of record.
 Preliminary report 
 Final report 

2017 in Russia
2017 disasters in Russia
Accidents and incidents involving the Let L-410 Turbolet
Aviation accidents and incidents in 2017
Aviation accidents and incidents in Russia
February 2017 events in Russia
Aviation accidents and incidents caused by loss of control
Airliner accidents and incidents caused by engine failure